The 1930 Michigan State Normal Hurons football team represented Michigan State Normal College (later renamed Eastern Michigan University) during the 1930 college football season.  In their ninth season under head coach Elton Rynearson, the Hurons compiled a record of 6–1 and outscored their opponents by a combined total of 145 to 14. Paul D. Shoemaker was the team captain.  The team played its home games at Normal Field on the school's campus in Ypsilanti, Michigan.

The Hurons lost their opening game, 7-0, to Michigan, a team that finished the season with an undefeated record and as champion of the Big Ten Conference. According to a United Press account of the game, the Hurons "outplayed the Wolves in two quarters, held them even in another, and broke just long enough in the third period to allow Michigan to flash through two forward passes and a lateral pass for a touchdown."

After losing to Michigan, the Hurons won their remaining six games, including five consecutive shutouts to end the season.

Schedule

References

Michigan State Normal
Eastern Michigan Eagles football seasons
Michigan Collegiate Conference football champion seasons
Michigan State Normal Hurons football